Rasmus Korhonen (born 22 October 2002) is a Finnish professional ice hockey goaltender currently playing for Ässät of the Finnish Liiga.

Playing career

In 2020, Korhonen played his first men's game for Ässät, against TPS. Straight after the first faceoff, TPS's Markus Nurmi shot the puck into the net, breaking the Liiga record for the fastest goal.

On 10 May 2021, Korhonen signed a two-year contract with Ässät of the Finnish Liiga. On 29 June, Korhonen was sent to Kokkolan Hermes of the Finnish Mestis on a one-year loan. Following completion of the 2021–22 season, with Hermes and a short loan stint with Vaasan Sport, Korhonen joined the Arizona Coyotes' AHL affiliate, the Tucson Roadrunners, on a tryout for the remainder of the North American season on 4 April 2022. Korhonen continued to play with Ässät for the 2022–23 Liiga season. Korhonen serves as the backup goalie to Niklas Rubin while also playing games for the U20 team.

Personal life
Korhonen is the son of a retired Finnish goaltender Markus Korhonen.

References

External links
 

2002 births
Living people
Arizona Coyotes draft picks
Ässät players
Finnish ice hockey goaltenders
Kokkolan Hermes players
People from Oulu
Tucson Roadrunners players
Vaasan Sport players